Bobby Radcliff, (born Robert Radcliff Ewan, September 22, 1951) is an American blues guitarist, singer, songwriter, and painter. Radcliff, raised in Bethesda, Maryland, started playing guitar at the early age of 12 and began playing in bands shortly after.

He is known for his position in the band "The Yarbs" (bandleader Chris Pestalozzi) which played cover songs, standards, and originals, crossing many genres, with an emphasis on original compositions and Blues. In 1968, Radcliff also joined "The Northside Blues Band", alongside Brett Littlehales (harmonica), Guy Dorsey (keyboard), William Bowman (bass), and Van Holmead (drums).

Musical inspirations
Radcliff's inspirations include Butterfield Blues Band (Paul Butterfield, Mike Bloomfield, and Elvin Bishop), but also draw from country guitarist James Burton (from Ricky Nelson's band), Kenneth "Thumbs" Carllile (from Jimmy Dickens band), Don Rich (from Buck Owen's Band), Steve Cropper, Slim Harpo, Howlin' Wolf, Muddy Waters, The Ventures, and many others. He was also influenced by the Rolling Stones, Eric Clapton, and many other British Blues Bands. Radcliff met many blues musicians during this period, such as Freddy King and Buddy Guy (1968).

Early career and influences
Radcliff was born in Washington, D.C., United States. A seminal moment in Radcliff's musical development came when he attended the Ann Arbor Blues Festival in 1969. It was there he saw Magic Sam for the first time. This performance inspired Radcliff to form his band – a trio he modeled after Sam's band. Radcliff was so inspired by Magic Sam that he soon boarded a bus to Chicago, venturing to meet his newfound guitar idol. Radcliff arrived in Chicago only to learn Magic Sam had suffered a major heart attack and was in Cook County Hospital. Radcliff sat by his bedside until Sam woke up. He explained that he had seen him at the Ann Arbor Festival and Sam was receptive to young Radcliff's pilgrimage to meet him.

After Sam recovered, he invited Radcliff back to his home at 1513 South Harding Street, in the heart of Chicago's West Side. Sam introduced Radcliff to the West Side Chicago Blues scene at such venues as The Alex Club (1815 Roosevelt Road) and the L & A Lounge on Pulaski (where Sam was a part-time bartender when he couldn't get enough work as a musician). They also went to The Key Largo where Otis Rush often performed and The Flash Lounge where Sam introduced Radcliff to Eddie Clearwater.

Some of the other musicians that Sam introduced Radcliff to in Chicago included: Mighty Joe Young (guitar), Ernie Gatewood (who also sometimes played bass for Magic Sam), Otis Rush, Jimmy Dawkins, Mac Thompson (bass), and Letha Jones (pianist Johnny Jones widow) and many other musicians. Radcliff often witnessed Sam performing with the above-mentioned musicians and many others.

Over the next six months, Radcliff visited Sam several times – staying with Sam's family in Chicago. One of the most important messages that Sam gave to Radcliff was to listen to all kinds of music (country, jazz, pop, classics, etc.) and to continue to be broadminded about the music he listened to because developing 'your style' was important, along with continuing to grow as a musician. Sam died in December 1969 at age 32 – from a heart attack. Radcliff and Dick Waterman attended Sam's funeral together.

By this time, Radcliff's style was infused with Magic Sam's unique sound. However, the breadth of Radcliff's music drew no boundaries his stylistic voice emerged, helping his career blossom.  Writer Dave Hussong Vintage Guitar Magazine (1990) touches on Radcliff's expansive musical range as a vocalist, instrumentalist, and live performer:

"Unencumbered by style restrictions, Radcliff brings a sense of intensity and conviction, both instrumentally and vocally (the latter being an area where many 90's interpreters fall face down) that puts his, and this, live performance into a very special league of its own."

In the early 1970s, he began performing with his band at clubs in the Washington D.C. area with a few key residencies: He performed a few nights each week at Cousin Nicks and Sundays and Mondays at Top 'o Foolery Jazz Club. He also frequently performed at Mr. Henry's and The Childe Harold's. Radcliff recorded his first 45 RPM single in 1974 on Aladdin Records with "It's Been a Long Long Day" by Amos Milburn and the B-side was "That's All I Need" which he learned from Magic Sam.

Members of his band during this time included many Washington DC players; Steve Shaw, Victor Spano, Dave Walker, Dick Heintze, Robbie Magruder, Joe Bradley, TNT Tribble, Tom Slavin, Danny Frankel, and Danny Gatton.

Move to New York
In 1977, he relocated to New York where he took a day job in a bookstore. He performed most evenings and was one of the house musicians at the Lone Star Cafe and at Tramps, working with Kinky Friedman, Bernard Purdie, Otis Rush, Lowell Folson, and Big Jay McNeeley, amongst many others.  Radcliff's own band played at many clubs, including CBGBs.  Radcliff's band was one of the few Blues bands playing there as his songwriting and style continued to flourish.

During this time, there were many chance meetings at his shows, including when John Belushi saw Radcliff play at the Lone Star Café with Kinky Friedman in the late 1970s. John then recruited Radcliff for guitar lessons. During this time, he regularly saw Belushi. Subsequently, Belushi invited  Radcliff to perform in the very first Blues Brother's show, featuring Belushi and Roomful of Blues.

In 1984 he recorded Early in the Morning, his first 33 RPM album, and by 1987 he began recording and performing full-time. Between 1989- and 1998,  Radcliff released five albums on the Black Top Record label: Dresses Too Short, Universal Blues, There's a Cold Grave in Your Way, Live at The Rynborn and Live at Tipitina's.  He toured extensively all over the world, performing at many premiere American and European festivals including the Berlin Jazz Festival, The Peer Festival in Belgium, The Byron Bay Blues Festival in Australia, the Warrnambool Festival in Australia, the Harvest Blues Festival in Ireland, the Lugano Blues Festival in Switzerland, the Lucerne Blues Festival in Switzerland, the Malmitalo Festival in Finland, The Aguas Blues Festival in Aguascalieutes Mexico, the Granada Jazz and Blues Festival in Spain, the San Remo Blues Festival in Italy, and the Café Volga Festival in Japan.  Radcliff performed at many other festivals, including tours with Earl King where Radcliff played under his own name and also as Earl's backing band.

In addition to the above-mentioned festivals, Radcliff toured Europe and the United States extensively with the "Blacktop Artists Tours" that included Robert Ward, Snooks Eaglin, Ronnie Earl, Anson Funderburgh, Clarence Holliman, and James "Thunderbird" Davis. In 1990, Radcliff received a New York Music Award from K-Rock radio station for "Best Blues Artist". That year, he also received a five star review from the October issue of Downbeat Magazine for "Dresses Too Short." From Downbeat Magazine:

Guitar Player 's April 1990 issue does an extensive interview of Radcliff, praising his style, and "Dresses Too Short" on many levels:

In 1991, Radcliff underwent two hand surgeries from which he made a full recovery and continued touring and playing at festivals. In 1991 he released, "Universal Blues".

In 2005, Radcliff released "Natural Ball" with producer Bill Bowman on the Rollo Label.

Radcliff subsequently recorded "Freaking Me Out" (Krellno Records).

His new CD (June 2016) "Absolute Hell" is another record of all originals produced by Chris Matheos and Radcliff. He builds on the music that has served him well and stretches it into new directions. With slivers of reggae, punk, humor, and darkness (the title is – after all, "Absolute Hell") it is a melting pot of songs – lyrical and instrumentals – that will underscore Radcliff's continuation as a vital musician on the scene today. "Absolute Hell" and "Freaking Me Out" are each rounded out by Radcliff's paintings which grace the cover.

Radcliff is considered an authority on Magic Sam, and continues to carry on that West Side Chicago Blues style, but is widely acknowledged as a true original with his sound. He plays many styles on acoustic guitar – with his trio – but is often seen playing his signature Gibson Les Paul. He remains an active bandleader and in-demand guitarist and singer. He continues his steady monthly residency at Terra Blues in New York City – which began in 1994. In addition, he performs throughout the United States and Europe.  In 2015 he was inducted into the New York Blues Hall of Fame as a Master Blues Artist.  He has recently guested with: Al Copley's Roomful of Blues Reunion Band, The Nighthawks, Bob Margolin's All Star Band, Jimmy 'Fast Fingers' Dawkins, Mark Hummel & Rusty Zinn, Byther Smith, Bruce Ewan, and most recently on Blues Violinist and singer/songwriter Ilana Katz Katz's record "Movin' On.'" (2016).

Discography
Early in the Morning (A-Okay, 1985)
Dresses Too Short (Black Top, 1989)
Universal Blues (Black Top, 1991)
There's a Cold Grave in Your Way (Black Top 1994)
Live at the Rynborn (Black Top 1997)
Natural Ball (Rollo Records, 2004)
Freaking Me Out (Krellno Records 2011)
Absolute Hell (Krellno Records 2016)

Compilations
Blues Cocktail Party Blacktop, 2009)
Blues Pajama Party (Blacktop Records) 1992

Guest appearances
She's Lightning When She Smiles (Dave Soldier: Robi Droli / Newtone, 1994)
 Traveling Fool (Brad Vickers and his Vestapolitans: Man Hat Tone, 2011)
Stuck With The Blues (Brad Vickers and his Vestapolitans: Man Hat Tone, 2012)
Movin' On (Ilana Katz Katz: Regina Royale, 2016)

Notes

References
 Richard Skelly, [ Bobby Radcliff] at AllMusic

1951 births
Living people
American blues guitarists
American male guitarists
American male singers
American blues singers
Singers from Washington, D.C.
Guitarists from Washington, D.C.
20th-century American guitarists
20th-century American male musicians